Hedrick is a small unincorporated community in Jordan Township, Warren County, in the U.S. state of Indiana.

History 
The town of Hedrick began on July 31, 1881 with its platting by locals Parmenas G. Smith and G. W. Compton.  The first house was built by John Hendricks and the first store opened by Zarse & Ahrens.  The town also gained a drug store operated by Frank Hartman and a school house erected in the early 1880s.  A post office was established in Hedrick on January 14, 1880 and closed on January 31, 1959.

A tornado nearly destroyed Hedrick on April 17, 1922.  The storm cut a path through the town an eighth of a mile wide, killing four residents, destroying six homes and ten businesses, and leaving only three buildings intact.  Including persons who lived near Hedrick but not within city limits, 11 people were killed and 35 injured.  Following the storm, newspapers estimated from ten to fifty thousand people flocked to the area to view the destruction, prompting the governor to deploy part of the state militia to control the crowds and prevent looting.

Geography 
Hedrick is located on flat, open farmland on the southern edge of Jordan Township, at the intersection of County Roads 900 West and 100 South. Its elevation is 709 feet. Prior to the founding of the town, a wooded site called Hedrick's Grove stood to the east of nearby Redwood Creek.

Demographics

References 

Unincorporated communities in Indiana
Unincorporated communities in Warren County, Indiana
Populated places established in 1881
1881 establishments in Indiana